Mark Flood may refer to:

 Mark Flood (ice hockey) (born 1984), Canadian ice hockey player
 Mark Flood (artist) (born 1957), American artist
 Mark Ellis, known as Flood (producer) (born 1960), British audio engineer/music producer

See also
 Flood (surname)
 Flood (disambiguation)